In topology, the Jordan curve theorem asserts that every Jordan curve (a plane simple closed curve) divides the plane into an "interior" region bounded by the curve and an "exterior" region containing all of the nearby and far away exterior points. Every continuous path connecting a point of one region to a point of the other intersects with the curve somewhere. While the theorem seems intuitively obvious, it takes some ingenuity to prove it by elementary means. "Although the JCT is one of the best known topological theorems, there are many, even among professional mathematicians, who have never read a proof of it.". More transparent proofs rely on the mathematical machinery of algebraic topology, and these lead to generalizations to higher-dimensional spaces.

The Jordan curve theorem is named after the mathematician Camille Jordan (1838–1922), who found its first proof. For decades, mathematicians generally thought that this proof was flawed and that the first rigorous proof was carried out by Oswald Veblen. However, this notion has been overturned by Thomas C. Hales and others.

Definitions and the statement of the Jordan theorem 

A Jordan curve or a simple closed curve in the plane R2 is the image C of an injective continuous map of a circle into the plane, φ: S1 → R2. A Jordan arc in the plane is the image of an injective continuous map of a closed and bounded interval  into the plane. It is a plane curve that is not necessarily smooth nor algebraic.

Alternatively, a Jordan curve is the image of a continuous map φ: [0,1] → R2 such that φ(0) = φ(1) and the restriction of φ to [0,1) is injective. The first two conditions say that C is a continuous loop, whereas the last condition stipulates that C has no self-intersection points.

With these definitions, the Jordan curve theorem can be stated as follows:

In contrast, the complement of a Jordan arc in the plane is connected.

Proof and generalizations 

The Jordan curve theorem was independently generalized to higher dimensions by H. Lebesgue and L. E. J. Brouwer in 1911, resulting in the Jordan–Brouwer separation theorem.

The proof uses homology theory. It is first established that, more generally, if X is homeomorphic to the k-sphere, then the reduced integral homology groups of Y = Rn+1 \ X are as follows:

This is proved by induction in k using the Mayer–Vietoris sequence. When n = k, the zeroth reduced homology of Y has rank 1, which means that Y has 2 connected components (which are, moreover, path connected), and with a bit of extra work, one shows that their common boundary is X. A further generalization was found by J. W. Alexander, who established the Alexander duality between the reduced homology of a compact subset X of Rn+1 and the reduced cohomology of its complement. If X is an n-dimensional compact connected submanifold of Rn+1 (or Sn+1) without boundary, its complement has 2 connected components.

There is a strengthening of the Jordan curve theorem, called the Jordan–Schönflies theorem, which states that the interior and the exterior planar regions determined by a Jordan curve in R2 are homeomorphic to the interior and exterior of the unit disk. In particular, for any point P in the interior region and a point A on the Jordan curve, there exists a Jordan arc connecting P with A and, with the exception of the endpoint A, completely lying in the interior region. An alternative and equivalent formulation of the Jordan–Schönflies theorem asserts that any Jordan curve φ: S1 → R2, where S1 is viewed as the unit circle in the plane, can be extended to a homeomorphism ψ: R2 → R2 of the plane. Unlike Lebesgue's and Brouwer's generalization of the Jordan curve theorem, this statement becomes false in higher dimensions: while the exterior of the unit ball in R3 is simply connected, because it retracts onto the unit sphere, the Alexander horned sphere is a subset of R3 homeomorphic to a sphere, but so twisted in space that the unbounded component of its complement in R3 is not simply connected, and hence not homeomorphic to the exterior of the unit ball.

Discrete version 
The Jordan curve theorem can be proved from the Brouwer fixed point theorem (in 2 dimensions), and the Brouwer fixed point theorem can be proved from the Hex theorem: "every game of Hex has at least one winner", from which we obtain a logical implication: Hex theorem implies Brouwer fixed point theorem, which implies Jordan curve theorem.

It is clear that Jordan curve theorem implies the "strong Hex theorem": "every game of Hex ends with exactly one winner, with no possibility of both sides losing or both sides winning", thus the Jordan curve theorem is equivalent to the strong Hex theorem, which is a purely discrete theorem.

The Brouwer fixed point theorem, by being sandwiched between the two equivalent theorems, is also equivalent to both.

In reverse mathematics, and computer-formalized mathematics, the Jordan curve theorem is commonly proved by first converting it to an equivalent discrete version similar to the strong Hex theorem, then proving the discrete version.

Application to image processing 

There are two obvious graph structures on : 

Both graph structures fail to satisfy the strong Hex theorem. The 4-neighbor square grid allows a no-winner situation, and the 8-neighbor square grid allows a two-winner situation.

For this reason, when computing connected components in a binary image, the 6-neighbor square grid is generally used.

Steinhaus chessboard theorem 
The Steinhaus chessboard theorem in some sense shows that the 4-neighbor grid and the 8-neighbor grid "together" implies the Jordan curve theorem, and the 6-neighbor grid is a precise interpolation between them.

The theorem states that: suppose you put bombs on some squares on a  chessboard, so that a king cannot move from the bottom side to the top side without stepping on a bomb, then a rook can move from the left side to the right side stepping only on bombs.

History and further proofs 

The statement of the Jordan curve theorem may seem obvious at first, but it is a rather difficult theorem to prove. Bernard Bolzano was the first to formulate a precise conjecture, observing that it was not a self-evident statement, but that it required a proof.

The first proof of this theorem was given by Camille Jordan in his lectures on real analysis, and was published in his book Cours d'analyse de l'École Polytechnique. There is some controversy about whether Jordan's proof was complete: the majority of commenters on it have claimed that the first complete proof was given later by Oswald Veblen, who said the following about Jordan's proof:

His proof, however, is unsatisfactory to many mathematicians. It assumes the theorem without proof in the important special case of a simple polygon, and of the argument from that point on, one must admit at least that all details are not given.

However, Thomas C. Hales wrote:

Nearly every modern citation that I have found agrees that the first correct proof is due to Veblen... In view of the heavy criticism of Jordan’s proof, I was surprised when I sat down to read his proof to find nothing objectionable about it. Since then, I have contacted a number of the authors who have criticized Jordan, and each case the author has admitted to having no direct knowledge of an error in Jordan’s proof.

Hales also pointed out that the special case of simple polygons is not only an easy exercise, but was not really used by Jordan anyway, and quoted Michael Reeken as saying:
Jordan’s proof is essentially correct... Jordan’s proof does not present the details in a satisfactory way. But the idea is right, and with some polishing the proof would be impeccable.

Earlier, Jordan's proof and another early proof by Charles Jean de la Vallée Poussin had already been critically analyzed and completed by Schoenflies (1924).

Due to the importance of the Jordan curve theorem in low-dimensional topology and complex analysis, it received much attention from prominent mathematicians of the first half of the 20th century. Various proofs of the theorem and its generalizations were constructed by J. W. Alexander, Louis Antoine, Ludwig Bieberbach, Luitzen Brouwer, Arnaud Denjoy, Friedrich Hartogs, Béla Kerékjártó, Alfred Pringsheim, and Arthur Moritz Schoenflies.

New elementary proofs of the Jordan curve theorem, as well as simplifications of the earlier proofs, continue to be carried out.

It is relatively simple to prove that the Jordan curve theorem holds for every Jordan polygon (Lemma 1), and every Jordan curve can be approximated arbitrarily well by a Jordan polygon (Lemma 2). A Jordan polygon is a polygonal chain, the boundary of a bounded connected open set, call it the open polygon, and its closure, the closed polygon. Consider the diameter  of the largest disk contained in the closed polygon. Evidently,  is positive. Using a sequence of Jordan polygons (that converge to the given Jordan curve) we have a sequence  presumably converging to a positive number, the diameter  of the largest disk contained in the closed region bounded by the Jordan curve. However, we have to prove that the sequence  does not converge to zero, using only the given Jordan curve, not the region presumably bounded by the curve. This is the point of Tverberg's Lemma 3. Roughly, the closed polygons should not thin to zero everywhere. Moreover, they should not thin to zero somewhere, which is the point of Tverberg's Lemma 4.

Another rigorous 6,500-line formal proof was produced in 2005 by an international team of mathematicians using the Mizar system. Both the Mizar and the HOL Light proof rely on libraries of previously proved theorems, so these two sizes are not comparable.  showed that in reverse mathematics the Jordan curve theorem is equivalent to weak König's lemma over the system .

Application 

In computational geometry, the Jordan curve theorem can be used for testing whether a point lies inside or outside a simple polygon.

From a given point, trace a ray that does not pass through any vertex of the polygon (all rays but a finite number are convenient). Then, compute the number  of intersections of the ray with an edge of the polygon. Jordan curve theorem proof implies that the point is inside the polygon if and only if  is odd.

See also 
 Denjoy–Riesz theorem, a description of certain sets of points in the plane that can be subsets of Jordan curves
 Lakes of Wada
 Quasi-Fuchsian group, a mathematical group that preserves a Jordan curve

Notes

References 

. author's site

External links 
 
 The full 6,500 line formal proof of Jordan's curve theorem in Mizar.
 Collection of proofs of the Jordan curve theorem at Andrew Ranicki's homepage
 A simple proof of Jordan curve theorem (PDF) by David B. Gauld
 

Theorems in topology
Theorems about curves